These are the Billboard magazine number-one albums of 1964, per the Billboard 200.

Chart history

See also
1964 in music
List of number-one albums (United States)

References

1964
Number-one albums of 1964 (U.S.)